NGC 3718, also called Arp 214, is a galaxy located approximately 52 million light years from Earth in the constellation Ursa Major. It is either a lenticular or spiral galaxy.

NGC 3718 has a warped, s-shape. This may be due to gravitational interaction between it and NGC 3729, another spiral galaxy located 150,000 light-years away.

NGC 3718 is a member of the Ursa Major Cluster.

References

External links
 

Ursa Major (constellation)
Ursa Major Cluster
Intermediate spiral galaxies
Peculiar galaxies
3718
35616
214